Sensing Murder is a television show in which three psychics are asked to act as psychic detectives to help provide evidence that might be useful in solving famous unsolved murder cases by communicating with the deceased victims. The program format was developed in 2002 by Nordisk Film TV in Denmark and has been sold to many countries including Australia, Belgium, Canada, Hungary, the Netherlands, New Zealand, Norway, Sweden, and the US. In 2004, Granada Entertainment bought the US rights. The New Zealand (TVNZ 2) series first aired in 2006 and was hosted by Rebecca Gibney. On 17 January 2017, it was announced that Amanda Billing would be the new host for the Australia/New Zealand version.

Format (Australia/New Zealand)

Each episode included detailed reenactments of the events leading up to the murder and the murder itself. Sections of these reenactments are then shown throughout the episode to refresh the viewer's memory of the events.

The producers state that the psychics are given no information about the case other than a photo, which some psychics prefer to keep face-down (The idea being that the less information they have, the better their supernormal abilities function). Other psychics choose to look at the photograph. To demonstrate their abilities, the psychics relay their impressions about the case/person which may match details in the case file. The psychics are then asked to provide any extra information they can using their psychic abilities. The show's private detective hosts the next section, in which he is asked to try to investigate any new leads suggested by the psychics and sometimes talk to the families of the deceased.

The show's producers claimed that before each series they tested 70-75 psychics and mediums in New Zealand and Australia with a case that had already been solved. (As claimed during each aired episode.) The most accurate psychics were then shortlisted from which the producers chose two or three of them to attempt to contact the spirits of the murder victims and to get impressions helpful to describe the victim, their circumstances around the murder, and the details of their death (as stated by the featured psychics during each episode). The three that were most often chosen (for all the episodes to date) are Deb Webber (Australian) and Sue Nicholson and Kelvin Cruickshank (New Zealanders).

Producer David Baldock has rejected a paranormal challenge on behalf of the psychics, but does propose possible further tests of the psychics if the Sensing Murder show airs a third series in New Zealand.

The Australian series of Sensing Murder also suffered numerous setbacks including a budget overrun which threatened to bankrupt the producer Rhonda Byrne.

Episodes (Australia/New Zealand)

Season 1 (2006)

Season 2 (2007)

Season 3 (2008)

Season 4 (2010)

Season 5 (2017)

Season 6 (2018)

Awards and nominations
2006 Qantas Media Awards
WINNER:Best Director, Non-Drama
WINNER:Best Reality Format
2008 Qantas Television and Film Awards
WINNER:Best Format-Reality Series

Books
Sensing Murder (released in 2008)
Walking in Light, autobiography of Kelvin Cruickshank (released in March 2009)

Case developments
The murder of George Engelbrecht was profiled in Season 1, the episode concluding with a shot of Engelbrecht's unmarked grave. The story caused a big public response, and the local community, Glover Memorial and JR Croft Funeral Directors together decided to organize a tribute. On 5 July 2006 there was a public unveiling of a headstone for Engelbrecht.

It was reported during the first episode of Season 2 (entitled, Sensing Murder: Insight) that after the episode about Luana Williams screened, Sue Nicholson received a threatening phonecall from an unknown male claiming to know where Luana's missing remains are located.  The psychics identified McLaren Falls as Williams' burial site in the show. Afterwards police received a report of a skull at the falls. However, this skull was several kilometres from the site identified by the psychics, and was part of a historical burial of three people, not the remains of Williams. Williams' disappearance remains unsolved.

The Australian series was filmed between 2003–2004, and all the cases are still unsolved. Recent episodes in New Zealand have generated unsubstantiated leads, however, the episode that screened on 16 Oct 2007 on TV2 in New Zealand claims to have identified the particular killer and the case has since been reopened by Police.

Criticisms
Sensing Murder was based on a Danish television programme Fornemmelse for mord which is on record as having failed to produce any results.

Australian police dismissed the show and said that they "only deal in factual evidence not psychic"

A source within New Zealand police has said "spiritual communications were not considered a creditable foundation for investigation"

The findings of recent episodes are disputed by skeptics and police, who do not officially believe in psychic detection and are in most cases not willing to follow up investigations conducted by private investigators on behalf of the show's producers.

The show was exposed on a 2007 episode of Eating Media Lunch, in a section called "Sensing Bullshit", which showed footage from the Australian TV show Caught on Hidden Camera where Deb Webber answered questions about a presenter's fictional sister. It was further satirized in the season finale, where host Jeremy Wells humorously highlighted the fact that not a single case had been solved.

Television New Zealand was criticized after the network used their Breakfast show to cross-promote the show, with vague claims about the whereabouts of missing toddler Aisling Symes.

On 20 June 2012, the New Zealand Police confirmed that a recent discovery of a body at a beach in Port Waikato ( from Auckland), was that of Jayne Furlong. Furlong's case had previously been featured during the second season of the Sensing Murder series in 2007. The New Zealand Skeptics claim that it is evidence that the TV psychics were incorrect about the location of Furlong's body, since they had claimed in the episode that she was located either in the Auckland Domain or on a demolition site in Auckland.

References

External links
Official website of 'Sensing Murder' NZ
NZ Reality TV episode recaps and discussion of Sensing Murder
Analysis of NZ 'Sensing Murder'
Victorian Skeptics 'Sensing Murder' Overview
Victorian Skeptics 'Sensing Murder' Review
'Sensing Murder' Psychic defends her record
 

Nine Network original programming
2006 Australian television series debuts
2018 Australian television series endings
2000s Australian crime television series
2010s Australian crime television series
New Zealand reality television series
TVNZ original programming
Works about murder
Psychics